Daniel Armstrong (born 10 October 1997) is a Scottish footballer who plays as a winger for Kilmarnock. Armstrong has previously played for Wolverhampton Wanderers, Dunfermline Athletic, Ross County and Raith Rovers.

Career
Armstrong began his career playing youth football with Scottish club Hamilton Academical. After almost 10 years with the club, Armstrong was signed by EFL Championship side Wolverhampton Wanderers on 27 October 2015, agreeing a three-year deal with the side.

After primarily playing for the club's youth sides, Armstrong was loaned out to Scottish Championship side Dunfermline Athletic at end of January 2018, with the player expressing a desire to play first-team football. His first start for the club came as a second-half substitute for Andy Ryan in a 0–0 draw with Livingston.

He was released by Wolves at the end of the 2017–18 season. Armstrong then signed a short-term contract with Raith Rovers, and scored five goals in 11 appearances for the Kirkcaldy club. Armstrong moved to Scottish Championship club Ross County in January 2019. He scored on his debut for Ross County against East Fife in the Scottish Challenge Cup. Armstrong left County on 2 September 2019, and then returned to Raith Rovers in October 2019.

Career statistics

Honours
Ross County 
Scottish Championship: 2018–19
Scottish Challenge Cup: 2018–19

References

External links

Living people
1997 births
Association football midfielders
Scottish footballers
Hamilton Academical F.C. players
Wolverhampton Wanderers F.C. players
Dunfermline Athletic F.C. players
Scottish Professional Football League players
Raith Rovers F.C. players
Ross County F.C. players
Kilmarnock F.C. players